Schema Records is a prominent Italian record label in Milan, Italy, that specializes in jazz, Brazilian, and Latin-influenced music. Schema is a sublabel of Ishtar a recording and publishing company based in Milan, which runs the sublabels Schema Rearward, Sensible, Summer Dawn, Big Sur Recordings and Milano 2000.

Schema was founded in 1997 by Luciano Cantone and Davide Rosa. Their catalogue includes music by Alessandro Magnanini, Balanco, Benny Bailey, Eraldo Volonté, Gerardo Frisina, Giorgio Azzolini, Johnny Griffin, Kenny Clarke/Francy Boland Big Band, Les Hommes, Mario Biondi, Neos, Nicola Conte, Piero Umiliani, Pietro Ciancaglini, Quartetto di Lucca, Rosalia de Souza, Sahib Shibab, Soulstance, Steve Evans, and Toco.

Artists

 Artless
 Balanço
 Beat Out Shrine
 Cabaret Noir
 Charles Hilton Brown
 Combogranata
 Conte & Petrella
 Doctor Abstract
 Drumagick
 Fez Combo
 Fragmentorchestra
 Gerardo Frisina
 Il Trio Di Romano Mussolini
 Intensive Jazz Sextet
 Les Hommes
 Lorenzo Tucci
 Mario Biondi
 Neos
 Nicola Conte
 P. Fedreghini and M. Bianchi
 Paolo Achenza Trio
 Paolo Fedreghini
 Quartetto Lo Greco
 Quartetto Moderno
 Quintetto Lo Greco
 Quintetto X
 Rosalia de Souza
 Rosario Giuliani Quartetto
 S-Tone Inc.
 Schema Sextet
 Soulstance
 Steve Evans
 Street Jazz Unit
 The Cabildo's Three
 The Dining Rooms
 The Invisible Session
 The Jazz Convention
 Toco
 Vuca
 Was a Bee

References

External links
 – Official site

Italian record labels
Jazz record labels
Schema Records artists